Cal-Nev-Ari is a census-designated place on U.S. Route 95 in Clark County, Nevada, United States, near the state's southernmost point. As of the 2010 census, the town had a population of 244. The town's name is a syllabic abbreviation of California, Nevada and Arizona.

Cal-Nev-Ari was created in the mid-1960s by Nancy and Everette "Slim" Kidwell, who acquired a  section of land from the U.S. government and commenced development of an airport-based community an hour by road from Las Vegas. In addition to the FAA-designated Kidwell Airport, the community has grown over the years to include a casino, motel, RV and mobile home parks, convenience market, and over 100 residential lots.

The town was listed for sale in 2016 for $8 million although it had been originally listed in 2010 for $17 million. It sold for the $8 million price to Heart of Nature, an organic minerals company, which plans to use the water to manufacture sulfur products for farms.

Geography
Cal-Nev-Ari is located at  (35.303196, -114.880795).

Demographics

At the 2000 census there were 278 people, 154 households, and 93 families in the CDP. The racial makeup of the CDP was 95.32% White, 1.80% from other races, and 2.88% from two or more races. Hispanic or Latino of any race were 2.16%.

Of the 154 households 7.1% had children under the age of 18 living with them, 55.8% were married couples living together, 1.9% had a female householder with no husband present, and 39.6% were non-families. Of all households 33.8% were one person and 14.9% were one person aged 65 or older. The average household size was 1.81 and the average family size was 2.20.

The age distribution was 7.6% under the age of 18, 1.1% from 18 to 24, 14.7% from 25 to 44, 42.1% from 45 to 64, and 34.5% 65 or older. The median age was 59 years. For every 100 females, there were 104.4 males. For every 100 females age 18 and over, there were 110.7 males.

The median household income was $42,563 and the median family income  was $44,333. Males had a median income of $24,632 versus $19,531 for females. The per capita income for the CDP was $20,870. None of the population or families were below the poverty line.

References

External links
 

1960s establishments in Nevada
Census-designated places in Clark County, Nevada
Piute Valley
Populated places established in the 1960s
Populated places in the Mojave Desert